The Men's 94 kilograms event at the 2018 Asian Games took place on 25 August 2018 at the Jakarta International Expo Hall A.

Schedule
All times are Western Indonesia Time (UTC+07:00)

Records 

 Vladimir Sedov's Asian record was rescinded in 2020.

Results
Legend
NM — No mark

New records
The following records were established during the competition.

References

External links
Weightlifting at the 2018 Asian Games
Official Result Book Weightlifting at awfederation.com

Men's 94 kg